Portet may refer to:

People
 Lorenzo Portet (1870–1917), Spanish anarchist 
 Renada-Laura Portet (1927-2021), French writer of Northern Catalonia

Places
 Canton of Portet-sur-Garonne, administrative division of the Haute-Garonne department, southern France
 Col de Portet, mountain pass in the French Pyrenees in the department of Hautes-Pyrénées and the Occitanie region
 Col de Portet d'Aspet, mountain pass in the central Pyrenees in the department of Haute-Garonne in France
 Portet, commune in the Pyrénées-Atlantiques department in southwestern France
 Portets, commune in the Gironde department in Nouvelle-Aquitaine in southwestern France
 Portet-d'Aspet, commune in the Haute-Garonne department in southwestern France
 Portet-de-Luchon, commune in the Haute-Garonne department in southwestern France
 Portet-sur-Garonne, ommune in the Haute-Garonne

Transportation
 Portet-Saint-Simon station, railway station in Portet-sur-Garonne, Occitanie, France
 Portet-Saint-Simon–Puigcerdà railway, secondary railway line in southwestern France
 Portets station, French railway station located in the commune of Portets, Gironde department